Analogue is the eighth studio album by the Norwegian band A-ha, released in 2005. It is a-ha's first album on Polydor Records (Universal), having previously been signed to Warner Music. Four singles were also released from this record. The album's second single, "Analogue (All I Want)" became the group's first top 10 hit on the UK Singles Chart since "Stay on These Roads" (1988). The album reached No. 24 in the UK and got silver certification there.

Background and recording

The song "Analogue (All I Want)" was originally a song called "Minor Key Sonata (Analogue)", which (like the rest of the album) was produced by Martin Terefe and mixed by Flood. Max Martin was then brought in to turn "Minor Key Sonata (Analogue)" into a more radio-friendly song, with a less surreal lyric and catchier chorus. The song was then re-written as "Analogue (All I Want)" and re-recorded, and is the only track on the album not produced by Terefe. Upon its release as a single, it became the band's first top 10 hit in the UK since 1988.

The non-album B-side to "Analogue (All I Want)", "Case Closed on Silver Shore", was also produced during the Analogue sessions by Terefe, and mixed by Flood. It was written by Paul Waaktaar-Savoy.

The lead vocal on "The Summers of Our Youth" is by Furuholmen (the second time on an A-ha release), with Harket joining him on the chorus.

On the live version of "Holyground", Waaktaar-Savoy plays an omnichord.

Track listing

 signifies an additional producer
 signifies a remixer

Personnel 
A-ha
 Morten Harket – vocals
 Paul Waaktaar-Savoy – keyboards, guitars, vocals
 Magne Furuholmen – keyboards, acoustic piano, guitars, vocals

Additional musicians
 Claes Björklund – acoustic piano, programming, guitars
 Christer Karlsson – acoustic piano 
 Michael Ilbert – programming
 Andreas Olsson – programming, guitars
 Martin Terefe – acoustic piano, guitars, bass 
 George Tanderø – programming 
 Geir Sundstøl – guitars
 Sven Lindvall – bass
 Jørun Bøgeberg – bass
 Per Lindvall – drums
 Alex Toff – drums
 Frode Unneland – drums
 Anthony LaMarchina – cello
 Kristin Wilkinson – viola
 David Angell – violin
 David Davidson – violin, string arrangements
 Graham Nash – backing vocals (3, 7)

Technical and Design
 Claes Björklund – recording 
 Michael Ilbert – recording, mixing (4)
 Andreas Olsson – recording 
 George Tanderø – recording 
 Martin Terefe – recording 
 Nathaniel Chan – additional recording 
 Kelly Pribble – additional recording 
 Eivind Skovdahl – additional recording 
 Bobby Shin – string recording 
 Flood – mixing (1, 2, 3, 5-13)
 Max Dingle – mix assistant (1, 2, 3, 5-13)
 Catherine Marks – mix assistant (1, 2, 3, 5-13)
 Andy Savours – mix assistant (1, 2, 3, 5-13)
 George Marino – mastering at Sterling Sound (New York City, New York, USA)
 Martin Kvamme – design 
 Stian Andersen – photography

Charts

Certifications

References

External links
Official A-ha site
"Analogue" discography on official A-ha site

2005 albums
A-ha albums
Albums produced by Max Martin
Universal Music Group albums
Polydor Records albums